Corey Gerrard (born 1985) is an Australian professional golfer. He has been a player on the PGA Tour of Australasia tour since 2009.

Early life
Gerrard grew up in Swan Hill, Victoria, Australia. He attended St.Mary's Primary School in Swan Hill from 1995 to 1996. His secondary schooling started in 1997 when enrolled at MacKillop College, Swan Hill and graduated in 2002. He enrolled in a Bachelor of Business undergraduate degree at Charles Sturt University in 2003. Recently welcomed a baby boy in 2014.

References

Australian male golfers
1985 births
Living people